Ola Christoffer Nordenrot, (born 9 March 1986) is a Swedish actor. He had the leading role of Alex in the film Den blomstertid nu kommer in 2018. Previously he has had roles in Kenny Begins, Wallander – Mordbrännaren and Sune – Best Man.
He also appeared in UFO Sweden.

References

External links

21st-century Swedish male actors

1986 births
Living people